The Annual Auckland Theatre Awards (colloquially The Hackmans, and not to be confused with the Auckland Community Theatre Awards) are annual performing arts awards presented by in Auckland New Zealand. The awards are normally presented at the Civic Theatre in Auckland. The Excellence Awards were introduced in 2014, and are judged by a panel of four to six industry judges. There is also a People's Choice section of awards. The awards were founded by Kip Chapman and Rachel Forman in 2008, and handed over to Eli Matthewson and Sophie Dowson in 2014.

Awards for 2020 
There were no awards presented for 2020.

Awards for 2019 
The awards for 2019 were presented at the Civic on 16 January 2020.

Awards for 2018 
The awards for 2018 were presented through a Facebook livestream rather than the usual live event at the Civic.

Awards for 2017 
The 9th Annual Auckland Theatre Awards were presented in the Wintergarden at The Civic on 4th December 2017. The ceremony was hosted by Johanna Cosgrove and directed by Sam Snedden. Jacinda Ardern presented the Hackman Cup. Jennifer Ward-Lealand presented the Excellence Awards.

Awards for 2016 
The awards for theatre during 2016 were presented on the 5th December 2016. The Excellence awards, which were presented by Jennifer Ward-Lealand, were judged by former Metro editor Simon Wilson, producer Angela Green, The Pantograph Punch founding editor, Rosabel Tan, and actor and director Jason Te Kare.

Awards for 2015 
The awards for 2015 were awarded on 7 December of that year. The judges for the Excellence awards were Metro editor Simon Wilson, producer Angela Green, playwright Sam Brooks, actor and director Jason Te Kare, costume designer Elizabeth Whiting and vocal coach Linda Cartwright.

Awards for 2014 
The awards for 2014 were announced on the 1 December of that year. The organisers introduced an Excellence Award section, judged by a panel of six. Jacinda Ardern, who was a Labour MP and shadow minister for the arts, presented some of the awards. A nationwide initiative to honour service and dedication to theatre was also premiered. The Service Honour medals were awarded for achieving 25, 50 or 100 professional productions. Recipients were Silo Theatre director Sophie Roberts, playwright Roger Hall and actor Jennifer Ward-Lealand.

References

External links 
Auckland Theatre Awards Facebook page

New Zealand theatre awards
Performing arts in New Zealand